The inauguration of Ranil Wickremesinghe as the 8th Executive President of the Democratic Socialist Republic of Sri Lanka took place on Thursday, 21 July 2022. This officially marked the start of Wickremesinghe's term in office, which will conclude in November 2024.

The inauguration took place amidst severe political and economic turmoil, including an ongoing economic crisis and the 2022 Sri Lankan political crisis. Wickremesinghe took the office of Executive President after he was voted in through a secret ballot election conducted by the Parliament on Wednesday, 20 July 2022. He received 134 out of the 219 valid votes.

Wickremesinghe will complete the remainder of former President Gotabaya Rajapaksa's term, after the latter resigned from the Presidency on 14 July 2022.

References

Wickremesinghe, Ranil
2022 Sri Lankan presidential election
July 2022 events in Asia
Ranil Wickremesinghe